The Fairy Queen, also known as the East Indian Railway No. 22, is a steam locomotive which was built in 1855. It was restored by Loco Works Perambur, Chennai in 1997, and housed at the Rewari Railway Heritage Museum. 

The train occasionally runs between New Delhi and Alwar. In 1998 it was listed in the Guinness Book of Records as the world's oldest steam locomotive in regular service. The Fairy Queen runs on the same route as the Palace on Wheels, the tourist train launched in 1982, and was awarded the National Tourism Award in 1999.

It get its name - EIR 21 Express from its builders Kitson, Thompson & Hewitson of England. The train was shipped to the Indian subcontinent and it was used to carry transport passengers from different walks of life and heavy cargo for more than 55 years. 

Unlike other luxury trains in India, the Fairy Queen has a total of only two coaches and a capacity to carry 50 passengers.

History

The locomotive was constructed by Kitson, Thompson and Hewitson at Leeds, in England, in 1855, and reached Kolkata, then known as Calcutta, in the same year.  On arrival, it was given fleet number "22" by its owner, the East Indian Railway Company; it was named 1895. Initially, the  gauge locomotive was used to haul light mail trains in West Bengal, operating between Howrah and Raniganj, and during the Indian Rebellion of 1857 hauled troop trains. Subsequently, the train was  consigned to a line construction duty in the state of Bihar, where it served until 1909.

The Fairy Queen spent the next 34 years on a pedestal outside Howrah station. In 1943, the locomotive was moved to the Railway Zonal Training School at Chandausi, in Uttar Pradesh, where it served as a curiosity object for many of the students based there.

Other contemporary locomotives 
A number of similar locomotives were built around the same time as the Fairy Queen. These were supplied by Kitson, Thompson and Hewitson and also by Stothert, Slaughter and Company of Bristol. One of these, Stothert-built Express, had been preserved at Jamalpur Locomotive Workshop, in Bihar, since 1901. As the inscription on Express pedestal claimed that it was the first locomotive to operate between Howrah and Raniganj, and it was numbered "21" by the East Indian Railway Company, it has been claimed that Express is the older of the two. Express was restored by Loco Works Perambur for running in 2011, making it a contender as the world's oldest operating steam locomotive. Express EIR 21 is currently running in different divisions of Southern Railway on weekends.

Specifications
The Fairy Queen was built by Kitson, Thompson and Hewitson at Leeds in England in 1855. It carries  of water in an underslung water tank. The locomotive weighs , and the coal tender .

Restoration
The Indian government bestowed heritage status on the Fairy Queen in 1972, rendering it a national treasure.  It was restored and given a special spot in the newly built National Rail Museum at Chanakyapuri, in New Delhi, which offers a comprehensive history of the Indian railway's defunct and operational models, their signalling apparatus, antique furnitures used, historic photographs, relevant literature, etc.

Following  the success of the Palace on Wheels, the locomotive was restored to full working order in 1997, in preparation for its first mainline journey in 88 years and its return to commercial service on 18 July. The operation was repeated between December and February in the following years. It was certified by the Guinness Book of Records in 1998 as the world's oldest steam locomotive in regular operation. The following year, the train received a National Tourism Award for the most innovative and unique tourism project from Atal Bihari Vajpayee, the then Prime Minister of India.

In 2011, it was discovered that rare locomotive parts that were "as good as irreplaceable" had been stolen, and the locomotive was moved to Perambur Loco Workshop at Chennai, in Tamil Nadu, for repair. On arrival, it was found that an estimated 50 to 60 parts had been looted, including "the boiler, condensor, lubricator and flow tubes".  The Deputy Chief Mechanical Engineer at the workshops stated "What we received is a dead body, a piece of metal whose every removable part has been removed, leaving only the metal shell. The list of parts to be procured is huge."  Officials estimated that it could take at least a year to restore the engine, even if suppliers of replacement parts could be found.  Following a substantial rebuild, in which the workshops had to construct the missing parts themselves, the locomotive returned to service on 22 December 2012.

Recognition 
In 1998, the train was certified by the Guinness Book of Records as the world's oldest steam locomotive which was currently in regular operation.

In 1999, it received a National Tourism Award for the most innovative and unique tourism project from the then prime minister of India, Atal Bihari Vajpayee.

See also

Luxury rail in India

References

External links
Fairy Queen website
Rangan Datta: Jewels of Time: Delhi National Rail Museum
A M Johnson and K Ward: A Brief History of Kitson and Company

Railway locomotives introduced in 1855
Individual locomotives of India
Steam locomotives of India
Preserved steam locomotives of India
Passenger locomotives
5 ft 6 in gauge locomotives
Luxury trains in India
Tourism in Delhi
Tourism in Haryana
Tourism in Rajasthan